Focus Bangla (formerly known as NE Bangla) is an Indian Bengali language 24x7 news channel launched in 2004 and owned by Rainbow Productions Ltd. Focus Bangla's impending launch would usher in an era of unprecedented and much-needed Bengali-language programming created and provided from Agartala (capital of Tripura State in Northeast India) and Kolkata (capital of West Bengal state). 

Focus Bangla is the Bengali language news channel of Focus News Network providing Bangla speakers unbiased and reliable news in real-time. Besides news from West Bengal, the channel offers national and international news and happenings, thus keeping the viewer informed in an increasingly connected world.

It raises issues related to the common man in West Bengal.

Its non-partisan news coverage has helped it carve a niche for itself. The channel has a wide range of programmes focused on major happenings of the day and analysis of major news events. In short, Focus Bangla reflects the kaleidoscope of Kolkata spanning across politics, arts, literature, cinema and culture.

See also
International broadcasting
List of Indian television stations
24-hour television news channels

External links

 

24-hour television news channels in India
Bengali-language television channels in India
Television channels and stations established in 2004
Television stations in Kolkata
2004 establishments in West Bengal